Gong Maoxin and Li Zhe were the defending champions, but Lee Hsin-han and Christopher Rungkat defeated them in the quarterfinals.
Pierre-Ludovic Duclos and Riccardo Ghedin won the title, defeating Nicholas Monroe and Ludovic Walter 6–4, 6–4 in the final.

Seeds

Draw

Draw

References
 Main Draw

Doubles
Chang-Sat Bangkok Open - Doubles
 in Thai tennis